is a manga written and illustrated by Mizuho Takayama, based on the Mobile Suit Gundam Side Story trilogy of video games.

Plot 
The story revolves around ace mobile suit tester Yuu Kajima, who tests the latest suits before they are mass-produced. But one day his test goes seriously haywire when he and his teammates are attacked by a mysterious blue mobile suit. Barely escaping from the melee, Yuu finds another surprise waiting for him: the blue machine is actually the Earth Federation's latest Gundam, and Yuu is to be its next pilot. Now, as he fights with the Gundam suit against Zeon ace Nimbus Schterzen, he must race against time to unravel the truth behind this mysterious machine, as well as the awaiting destiny of its pilot.

External links 
Tokyopop's Official Blue Destiny Site

Manga based on video games
Blue Destiny
1997 manga
Kodansha manga
Children's manga
Shōnen manga
Military science fiction comics